John Bryant-Meisner (born 21 September 1994) is a Swedish racing driver. He currently resides in Solna.

Career

Karting
Born in Stockholm, he began his karting career at age nine. He competed in karting competitions between 2004–2009.

Formula Renault 2.0 Sweden & Michelin Formula Renault Winter Cup
He started his single-seater career in 2010 by competing in the Formula Renault 2.0 Sweden for Team BS Motorsport and Michelin Formula Renault Winter Cup driving for the Koiranen GP team. He gained one podium in the Formula Renault 2.0 Sweden series.

Formula Renault 2.0 Eurocup & NEC series
In 2010 and 2011 he also participated in the Formula Renault 2.0 NEC series and in 2011 in Eurocup Formula Renault 2.0, both with Koiranen GP. He gained one podium in the Formula Renault 2.0 NEC series.

Protyre Formula Renault UK Finals Series
He competed in the 2011 Protyre Formula Renault UK Finals Series again with Koiranen GP.

German Formula Three Championship
2012 saw Bryant-Meisner make his debut in Formula 3, as he signed a deal to race with Swedish outfit Performance Racing in the 2012 German Formula Three season. He scored his maiden podium in the opening round at Zandvoort by finishing third. In May, he crashed his car by hitting a concrete wall during testing. He fractured his vertebrae in his spine and was out for seven months, missing the rest of the season.

He returned in the 2013 German Formula Three season still racing for Performance Racing. In the first round, he made successful comeback and convincingly gained his first ever Formula 3 win at Oschersleben. He also won the second race of the second round at Spa.

British Formula 3 Championship
In 2013, he raced in the British Formula 3 also for Performance Racing as a guest driver. He won two races in the opening round at Silverstone.

FIA European Formula 3 Championship
In 2013, he participated in the 2013 FIA European Formula 3 Championship season last two races, racing for Fortec Motorsport. He managed to score two points by the end of the season.

Racing record

Career summary

† As Bryant-Meisner was a guest driver, he was ineligible for points.

Complete FIA European Formula 3 Championship results
(key)

† Driver did not finish the race, but was classified as he completed over 90% of the race distance.

Complete GP3 Series results
(key) (Races in bold indicate pole position) (Races in italics indicate fastest lap)

† Driver did not finish the race, but was classified as he completed over 90% of the race distance.

References

External links
 
 
 

1994 births
Living people
Sportspeople from Stockholm
Swedish racing drivers
German Formula Three Championship drivers
British Formula Three Championship drivers
FIA Formula 3 European Championship drivers
Swedish GP3 Series drivers
Asian Le Mans Series drivers
Karting World Championship drivers
Koiranen GP drivers
Performance Racing drivers
Fortec Motorsport drivers
Trident Racing drivers
Sweden Formula Renault 2.0 drivers
Formula Renault Eurocup drivers
Formula Renault 2.0 NEC drivers
Finland Formula Renault 2.0 drivers